Stephen F. Jones (born  1953) is an English expert on post-Communist societies in the former Soviet Union and Eastern Europe who currently serves as Chair of Russian and Eurasian Studies at Mount Holyoke College, South Hadley, Massachusetts.

Jones received his B.A. in 1974 from the University of Essex, his Ph.D. from the London School of Economics in 1984. He has taught at the University of California, Santa Cruz (1986), the University of London (1986-88), and at the University of Oxford (1988–89).

He specializes in the history and politics of the South Caucasus nations (Georgia, Armenia, Azerbaijan). Stephen Jones speaks fluent Georgian and reads Russian and French fluently. He has lectured at various schools in the United States and regularly briefs the CIA and U.S. State Department in the Caucasus.

Selected publications
 Socialism in Georgian Colors: The European Road to Social Democracy, 1883–1917 (Harvard University Press 2005)
 War and Revolution in the Caucasus: Georgia Ablaze (Routledge 2010)
 Georgia: A Political History Since Independence (I.B. Tauris 2012)
The Making of Modern Georgia, 1918-2012: The First Georgian Republic and its Successors (Routledge 2014)

References

External links

Official website
Faculty website

1952 births
Living people
21st-century American historians
21st-century American male writers
American political scientists
Mount Holyoke College faculty
Kartvelian studies scholars
Alumni of the University of Essex
Alumni of the London School of Economics
Academics of the University of London
Academics of the University of Oxford
American male non-fiction writers